Street Love is the second studio album by singer Lloyd, it was released on March 13, 2007 through Young Goldie Music, The Inc. Records, Sho'nuff Records, and Universal Motown. The first single is "You" featuring Lil Wayne. The second single off the album is called "Get It Shawty" and the remix featured Yung Joc.

The album received a positive reception from critics who considered it an improvement over his debut album Southside. Street Love debuted on the US Billboard 200 at number two, selling 144,672 copies sold in its first week. As of April 2007 the album was certified Gold by the RIAA with an excess of 500,000 copies sold.

Critical reception

Street Love garnered a generally positive reception from music critics who found it an improvement over Southside. AllMusic's David Jeffries praised the album for shedding Lloyd's thug image and replacing it with slow jams that come across as more convincing and sexy, saying that "Lloyd is more comfortable, committed, and believable on Street Love, and if taken in small doses, you can add satisfying to the list." Mark Edward Nero of About.com also complimented the album for providing songs that will catch the public's attention but also said that its lacking in artistic quality, substance and vocal delivery, concluding with "That said, the album isn't bad. Lloyd plays his role well and manages to come across as sensitive yet strong, and not as a sappy sucker." Adam Pearthree of Okayplayer said that despite faltering towards the end he praised the track variety throughout the record for having formulaic but attention-grabbing lyrical work, concluding that "Those looking for the next great step forward in R&B will be sorely disappointed, but if you need to fill the gap in your life while waiting for a new Usher album, Street Love will not let you down." Andy Greenwald of Entertainment Weekly said that the album had potential but concluded with, "Unfortunately, in between, Lloyd's talents are adrift on an ocean of samey slow jams." Gentry Boeckel of PopMatters criticized the record for having an overabundance of slow-paced ballads, saying that "Lloyd seems more interested in making staid, tried-and-true, music-that-will-get-me-laid music, rather than taking the style to new enclaves."

Track listing

 "You (Remix)" contains samples of "True" by Spandau Ballet.

Charts

Weekly charts

Certifications

Year-end charts

References

2007 albums
Lloyd (singer) albums
Albums produced by Bryan-Michael Cox
Albums produced by Eric Hudson
Albums produced by Irv Gotti
Albums produced by Jazze Pha
Albums produced by Jasper Cameron
Albums produced by Big Reese